Abdul Qader Al Rais (Arabic: عبد القادر الريس) is a multi-award-winning, Emirati painter noted for his abstract art which combines geometric shapes with Arabic calligraphy.

Early life
Abdullah al Shamsi (or Abdul Qader al-Raes) was born in 1951 in Dubai in the United Arab Emirates. He first began to take art seriously, at the age of 14, following his father's death, when his mother sent him to Kuwait to live with his sister. He considered himself, “lucky because the Kuwaiti government was supporting art at that time so I had access to all the art materials I needed for free.” He showed an early talent, which he attributed as a "gift from God."

He remained with his sister in Kuwait until he was 18 yrs old by which time he had completed his basic education at the grammar school. Undoubtedly, Abdul Qader's early experiences in Kuwait, including the teachings impacted his development both artistically and intellectually.

Career
On his return to the Emirates, in 1974, he worked at the Ministry of Labour as a labour inspector and pursued his further education by earning a degree in Sharia Law at the United Arab Emirates University, Al Ain. From 1974, he discontinued painting altogether and did not pick up a paint-brush for another 12 years.

When he began painting again, he focussed on producing sweeping landscapes, architectural studies and abstract forms. As a young artist, he was awarded first honour for his artwork inspired by the movie, The Agony and the Ecstasy.  This signaled the beginning of his career in art. Abdul Qader's incessant pencil and watercolour sketches clearly defined his role in life as an artist. These early works has led to continued success, as he received multiple awards, which garnered the attention of national and international media. Abdul Qader Al Rais became a household name in the GCC world of fine arts.

As an artist, he is largely self-taught. His interest in old local architecture gems and nature were depicted in romantic realism. His early work explores local scenery, coastlines and idyllic landscape in the UAE. They were essentially realist but it is an extraordinary realism distilled by an exacting eye and a mystical imagination which gives his works much of its power. Not only does he capture the place, but also the sense of time, in a medium that is most expressive, appealing and challenging – watercolour. His later works, both in oil and watercolour, retain much of the original influences, but also include geometric elements and calligraphy, which may be familiar to the Middle Eastern eye, but seen as esoteric or enigmatic to Western audiences.

He is a founding member of the Emirates Fine Art Society and is considered to be one of the pioneers of contemporary art in the Emirates, noted for his mainly abstract artwork which has been widely exhibited both within the UAE and abroad. Al Rais artwork can be found in Emirati palaces, government offices and in the personal art collections of members of the royal family of Dubai.

Works
He is most noted for abstract works that incorporate geometric forms and Arabic script. The use of floating squares across the canvas has become a signature feature in his artworks.

He continued for the next several years to concentrate on local sceneries that became his trademark. Then, at the crucial juncture of his career, when he was moving beyond the traditional subjects in watercolour so indelibly associated with his name, Abdul Qader stepped outside himself and began to address issues of artistic authorship and individual style with acuity and critical distance.

Motifs of geometric ops producing multiple illusions of depth were initially added on to the subject. With this series, Abdul Qader succeeded in making the geometric forms surrounding the subject matter equally important as the subject matter itself.  Moving further, changes in paint handling and stylistic staccato make for extreme variations among his realistic paintings resulting into calligraphic abstract juxtaposed with geometric ops and realistic images in vibrant new canvasses.

The merging of style is his language of pure individual self-expression – and that style is not inextricably bound to a single, authorial hand, but rather separate, mobile, detachable, and potentially re-inhabitable – Abdul Qader Al Raes’ signature style.

In 2015, his artwork was used to decorate carriages of the Dubai Metro, as part of the Dubai Arts Season.

During 2016, Al Rais art pieces were included in a group exhibition in Berlin, entitled Art Nomads – Made in the Emirates which represented contemporary Emirati art and culture.

Solo exhibitions

1974 – 1st Solo Exhibition – Dubai
1987 – Dubai, Sharjah
1988 – Dubai
1989 – Abu Dhabi
1990 – Dubai
1991 – Abu Dhabi, Dubai
1992 – Prague, Liberec, Czechoslovakia, Beirut
1993 – Washington DC
1994 – Al Ain, Dubai
1996 – Abu Dhabi, Germany, Dubai
1997 – Abu Dhabi, Dubai, Sharjah Biennial
2001 – Abu Dhabi, Kuwait, Dubai, Al Ain
2002 – Qatar
2003 – Dubai; 2004-Dubai
2005 – Dubai, Oman
2007 – Dubai, Abu Dhabi
2008 – Dubai, Riyadh

Selected awards
1975 – First Prize, 1st Youth Exhibition-Dubai
1983 – Appreciation Certificate, Arab Painter's Exhibition-Kuwait
1988 – First Prize, 3rd Spring Exhibition-Abu Dhabi
1989 – Second Prize, 4th Spring Exhibition-Abu Dhabi
1990 – First Prize, 6th Emirates Exhibition-Abu Dhabi
1991 – First Prize, 1st Emirates Exhibition-Al Ain
1990, 1992, 1993 – Golden Dana Award-Kuwait
1993 – Juries Award, Sharjah Biennial-UAE
1992, 1994 & 1996 – First Prize Sultan Al Owais Award for Scientific Studies and Creativity-UAE
1995 – Juries Award Latakia Biennial-Syria
1997 – Honoured in Sharjah Biennial-UAE
1999 – First Prize Exhibition of “Emirates in the Eyes of its People”
1999 – Golden Soafah (palm Leaf), GCC Exhibition
2006 – Emirates Appreciation Award
2016 – First Prize Exhibition of “Emirates in the Eyes of its People”

Selected bibliography
 The Human…The Home - Abdul Qader Al Rais, Catalogue Raisonne ©2005 Al Owais Cultural Foundation, Dubai
 The Colours of My Life – Abdul Qader Al Rais, Dubai Cultural Council, February 2008
 Abdul Qader Al Rais, Catalogue Raisonne ©2008, Hewar Art Gallery, Riyadh, Saudi Arabia

References

External links

1951 births
Living people
Emirati painters
Emirati expatriates in Kuwait
United Arab Emirates University alumni
People from Dubai
Emirati contemporary artists